Alberto Abadie (born April 3, 1968) is professor of the department of economics at MIT and Associate Director of the Institute for Data, Systems, and Society (IDSS) also at MIT. He was born in the Basque Country, Spain. He received his PhD in economics from MIT in 1999. Upon graduating, he joined the faculty at the Harvard Kennedy School, where he was promoted to full professor in 2005. He returned to MIT in 2016.

Alberto Abadie's research interests lie in the areas of econometric methodology and applied econometrics, with special emphasis on causal inference and program evaluation methods. He has made fundamental contributions to important areas in econometrics and statistics, including treatment effect models, instrumental variable estimation, matching estimators, difference in differences, and synthetic controls. He is Associate Editor of AER: Insights, and has previously served as Editor of the Review of Economics and Statistics and Associate Editor of Econometrica and the Journal of Business and Economic Statistics. He is a Fellow of the Econometric Society and a member of the American Academy of Arts and Sciences.

References

External links
 Alberto Abadie's Home Page at MIT

Spanish political scientists
21st-century Spanish economists
20th-century Spanish economists
MIT School of Humanities, Arts, and Social Sciences faculty
MIT School of Humanities, Arts, and Social Sciences alumni
University of the Basque Country alumni
Living people
1968 births
Fellows of the Econometric Society
Spanish expatriates in the United States